X Factor is a Danish television music competition to find new singing talent. Sofie Linde Lauridsen was the host again. Thomas Blachman, Mette Lindberg and Remee returned for their respective ninth second and seventh seasons as judges. Morten Nørgaard won the competition and Remee became the winning mentor for the 4th time and won 3 seasons in a row and also for the first time in the Danish X Factor history a judge has won the show with 3 different categories.

Judges and hosts
On 12 August 2016 it was announced that Sofie Linde Lauridsen would be the host again. Also, Thomas Blachman, Mette Lindberg and Remee would also return as judges.

Selection process

Auditions took place in Copenhagen and Aarhus.

5 Chair Challenge
The 5 Chair Challenge returned for season 10.  Thomas Blachman mentored the 15-22s, Remee had the Over 23s and Mette Lindberg had the Groups.

The 16 successful acts were:
15-22s: Chili, Liv, Martin, Mia, Rosa, Saliou
Over 23s: Anders, Libbi, Mike, Morten, Samanta
Groups: Fyhnen Sisters, Ladies with Attitude, Lasse & Nanna, Southside, VKation

Martin was originally eliminated from the 5 Chair Challenge but Blachman later regretted his decision. Therefore, he brought Martin back in the competition and therefore, 16 acts would be competing in Bootcamp.

Bootcamp
The Bootcamp took place at Egeskov Slot.

The 7 eliminated acts were:
15-22s: Liv, Rosa, Saliou
Over 23s: Anders, Libbi
Groups: Lasse & Nanna, Southside

Contestants

Key:
 – Winner
 – Runner-up

Live shows
The live shows started on February 17 at DR Byen.
Colour key

Contestants' colour key:
{|
|-
| – 15-22s (Blachman's contestants)
|-
| – Over 23s (Remee's contestants)
|-
| – Groups (Lindberg's contestants)
|}

Live show details

Week 1 (February 17) 
Theme:  Signature

Judges' votes to eliminate
 Remee: Fyhnen Sisters 
 Lindberg: Mike Beck 
 Blachman: Fyhnen Sisters

Week 2 (February 24) 
Theme:  Songs from the judges decades

Judges' votes to eliminate
 Lindberg: Mike Beck 
 Remee: Ladies with Attitude 
 Blachman: Mike Beck

Week 3 (March 3) 
Theme: Break-up songs

Judges' votes to eliminate
 Blachman: Ladies with Attitude 
 Remee: VKation 
 Lindberg: Ladies with Attitude

Week 4 (March 10) 
Theme:  Crooners and Divas accompanied by DR Big Band

Judges' votes to eliminate
 Remee: Martin Prytz 
 Blachman: Samanta Gomez 
 Lindberg: Martin Prytz

Week 5 (March 17) 
Theme:  International hits
 Group Performance: "Rock Your Body"/"Sorry"/"...Baby One More Time"/"Thriller"/"24K Magic"/"Purple Rain" (Performed of the 5 Finalists)

Judges' votes to eliminate
 Lindberg: Samanta Gomez
 Remee: VKation 
 Blachman: Samanta Gomez

Week 6: Semi-final (24 March)
 Theme: Anniversary Song (songs previously performed by previous finalists), Viewers Choice
 Musical Guest: KAPUTU ("Hvor du går")

The semi-final did not feature a final showdown and instead the act with the fewest public votes, VKation, was automatically eliminated.

Week 7: Final (31 March) 
 Theme: Free Choice, Dallas Austin's Choice, Winner's single
 Musical guests: Gulddreng ("Utro"), Ed Sheeran ("Castle on the Hill") & ("Shape of You") 
 Group Performances: "Fem Fine Frøkner" (Gabrielle; Performed of X Factor 2017 Finalists and Sofie Linde Lauridsen);  "Ked af det" (Performed of Gulddreng and Auditionees)

References

Season 10
2016 Danish television seasons
2017 Danish television seasons
The X Factor seasons